Angie Loy (born April 23, 1982 in Loysville, Pennsylvania) is a field hockey forward from the United States, who earned her first career cap versus Ireland on January 14, 2004 at Stanford, California. Loy attended the Old Dominion University.  She was raised in rural Perry County, PA and attended West Perry High School in Elliottsburg, PA.  On September 25, 2008 the West Perry Field Hockey team retired Loy's high school hockey jersey (#3).  She is the first player to have her jersey retired by the field hockey team and the fourth player ever to have their jersey retired at West Perry High School.

International senior competitions
 2004 – Pan American Cup, Bridgetown (2nd)
 2004 – Olympic Qualifying Tournament, Auckland (6th)
 2005 – Champions Challenge, Virginia Beach (5th)
 2006 – World Cup Qualifier, Rome (4th)
 2006 – World Cup, Madrid (6th)
 2008 – 2008 Beijing Summer Olympics, Beijing (lead the US team in scoring (4 goals))

References
 USA Field Hockey
 West Perry grad bound for Beijing and Olympic trial
 Loy’s late goal lifts U.S. in tilt against Argentina
 West Perry Grad Achieves Olympic Dream

External links
 

1982 births
Living people
American female field hockey players
Old Dominion Monarchs field hockey players
People from Perry County, Pennsylvania
Sportspeople from Pennsylvania
Olympic field hockey players of the United States
Field hockey players at the 2008 Summer Olympics